Cyril "Midnight" Blake (22 October 1900 – 3 December 1951) was a Trinidadian jazz trumpeter.

Biography
Blake moved to England about 1918, where he played in a British group called the Southern Syncopated Orchestra. He worked in Paris and London as a musician throughout the 1920s, and in the 1930s played in the bands of Leon Abbey, Happy Blake, Rudolph Dunbar, Leslie Thompson, Joe Appleton, and Lauderic Caton. In 1938 he formed his own band, which was centred on Jig's Club in London; he recorded several times with this ensemble. In the 1940s Blake led his band behind Lord Kitchener for recordings on Parlophone Records, playing in a calypso style. Late in his life he returned to Trinidad, where he continued to lead bands. He died of an illness in 1951.

External links
[ Cyril Blake] at Allmusic

1900 births
1951 deaths
Calypsonians
Jazz trumpeters
Trinidad and Tobago musicians
20th-century trumpeters